Andriy Onufriyenko (born 7 January 1983) is an athlete and Paralympian from Ukraine competing mainly in category T38 sprint events.

He competed in the 2000 Summer Paralympics in Sydney, Australia. There he finished fourth in the men's 100 metres - T38 event, finished fourth in the men's 200 metres - T38 event and finished fourth in the men's 400 metres - T38 event.  He also competed at the 2004 Summer Paralympics in Athens, Greece. There he won a bronze medal in the men's 4 x 100 metre relay - T35-38 event, a bronze medal in the men's 4 x 400 metre relay - T35-38 event, finished sixth in the men's 100 metres - T38 event, finished fourth in the men's 200 metres - T38 event and finished fourth in the men's 400 metres - T38 event. He also competed at the 2008 Summer Paralympics in Beijing, China. There he won a bronze medal in the men's 400 metres - T38 event, finished sixth in the men's 100 metres - T38 event and went out in the first round of the men's 200 metres - T38 event

External links 
 

Paralympic athletes of Ukraine
Athletes (track and field) at the 2000 Summer Paralympics
Athletes (track and field) at the 2004 Summer Paralympics
Athletes (track and field) at the 2008 Summer Paralympics
Paralympic bronze medalists for Ukraine
Living people
1983 births
Ukrainian male sprinters
Ukrainian male long jumpers
Medalists at the 2004 Summer Paralympics
Medalists at the 2008 Summer Paralympics
Medalists at the World Para Athletics European Championships
Paralympic medalists in athletics (track and field)